Dragnet is the second studio album by English post-punk band the Fall, released on 26 October 1979 through Step-Forward Records. Appearing less than eight months after its predecessor, Live at the Witch Trials, Dragnet established at an early stage two key patterns characteristic of the group's future: that of high productivity and that of a regular turnover of group members.

Background and recording 

Only Mark E. Smith and Marc Riley remained in the lineup from the band's debut album, Live at the Witch Trials. Drummer Karl Burns left soon after recording and was replaced by Mike Leigh, while founder member Martin Bramah quit mid-tour in April 1979, when some of the material intended for the second album had already been written. Smith quickly recruited guitarist Craig Scanlon and bassist Steve Hanley, who were Fall roadies, members of support band Staff 9 and friends of Marc Riley's; both were just 18 & 19, respectively, when they joined the group and would form the Fall's musical backbone until the mid-1990s. Riley moved from bass to guitar (his first instrument), and also started to play keyboards following Yvonne Pawlett's departure after recording the "Rowche Rumble" single.

The album, titled Dragnet, was recorded 2–4 August 1979. Dragnet'''s sound was notably muddy and lo-fi – Riley has claimed that this was a deliberate contrast to the sharp, clean sound of Live at the Witch Trials, while Smith claimed that the recording studio was so appalled by the sound that the group were asked to remove the studio's name from the album sleeve. Bramah did not receive credit for his contributions, and there were several songs that were altered heavily by the group after his departure. Among these was "Before the Moon Falls", which had as its musical backing a song that later became the basis for the Blue Orchids' "Work".

The album is somewhat self-referential lyrically, with several songs referencing the music industry. At least two tracks, "Printhead" and "Your Heart Out", quote or paraphrase reviews of the band's live shows. "Printhead" even verifies this fact within its own lyrics. "Dice Man" takes its title from the novel The Dice Man by Luke Rhinehart. "Spectre Vs Rector" was, according to Pitchforks Jason Heller, an answer to "Music Scene" on Live at the Witch Trials, commenting that "its sludge and subliminal menace practically invented post-rock as an afterthought". "Muzorewi's Daughter", with its "slow, relentless acceleration...punctuated by Smith's shrieks," was described as "one of the most terrifying Fall songs of them all".Dragnet would be the Fall's final album for Miles Copeland III's Step-Forward label; the band signed with Rough Trade Records in early 1980.

 Reception 

Reviews for Dragnet have been generally favourable. Sounds critic Dave McCullough wrote that "The Fall have never been stronger, the sound is more concise, more assured and Mark Smith's writing has an aura of confidence and direction to it." In his review for Record Mirror, Chris Westwood said that the album's "clattering demo-tape production" effectively draws attention to the songs' lyrics: "Odd lines of vocal stick, and it's the odd lines that count." Dragnet was ranked the 35th best album of 1979 by NME.

David Quantick, reviewing the 1999 reissue for Q, found that Dragnet contains some of Smith's best songs and noted its crude production, remarking that the album sounds as if it "was recorded on a home cassette recorder in a multi-storey car park." Nicholas Collias, reviewing the 2004 reissue for the Boise Weekly, viewed the music on the album as providing "the blueprint for The Fall's golden age of the early 1980s: paper-thin rockabilly with tinny, meandering guitars and lilting keyboards." In his review of the 2016 reissue, Jason Heller of Pitchfork described the album as "weighty" and "overwhelmingly dense." Vulture's Stuart Berman cited Dragnet as "the first album where the Fall tap into their powers of hypnosis, locking into the sinister back-alley prowl of 'Before the Moon Falls' and the Morse code, cowbell-clanged pummel of 'Spectre vs Rector,' all while Smith transcends from the realm of mere punk carnival barker to oracle of the underground." In 2018, Billboard writer Geeta Dayal ranked it the Fall's fourth best album.Stereogums Robert Ham was less enthusiastic about Dragnet and felt that "the songs are playful and feel like they were constructed just a few minutes before the tape started rolling, but that doesn't suit this version of The Fall one bit," criticising its lack of "tension". Trouser Press opined that Dragnet is "not one of The Fall's best efforts, but contains at least two classic numbers, 'Spectre vs. Rector' and 'A Figure Walks'." AllMusic reviewer Ned Raggett noted that while several tracks "come across as Fall-by-numbers (even then, already better than plenty of other bands)," the album nonetheless includes "thorough standouts" such as "Spectre Vs Rector".

 Reissues 
In 2004, Castle Music reissued the album with, for the first time, remastered audio from the original master tapes. The reissue included the contemporaneous singles "Rowche Rumble" and "Fiery Jack" (and the singles' B-sides), but also previously unheard alternate takes and breakdowns from the "Rowche Rumble" recording sessions. Dragnet'' was reissued on vinyl in 2016 on the Superior Viaduct label.

Track listing 
All tracks arranged by the Fall except "Printhead" (arranged by the Fall and Martin Bramah).

Personnel 
 The Fall

 Mark E. Smith – vocals, electric piano, kazoo, tape
 Steve Hanley – bass guitar, backing vocals
 Marc Riley – guitar, acoustic guitar, backing vocals
 Craig Scanlon – guitar, electric piano, kazoo, tape (credited as "Craig Scanlan")
 Mike Leigh – drums

 Additional musicians

 Kay Carroll – backing vocals (credited as "Mrs. Horace Sullivan")
 Yvonne Pawlett – keyboards ("Rowche Rumble" and "In My Area")

 Technical

 The Fall – production (including "Rowche Rumble" and "Fiery Jack" single tracks)
 Grant Showbiz – production
 John Brierley – engineering
 Oz McCormick – production ("Rowche Rumble" single tracks)
 Geoff Travis – production ("Fiery Jack" single tracks) 
 Mayo Thompson – production ("Fiery Jack" single tracks)
 Tina Prior – front cover
 Brendan Jackson – photography
 Mark E. Smith – back cover, insert

References

External links 
 

1979 albums
The Fall (band) albums
Albums produced by Grant Showbiz